Gudivada bus station is a bus station located in Gudivada city of the Indian state of Andhra Pradesh. It is owned and operated by Andhra Pradesh State Road Transport Corporation. It is one of the major bus stations in the state of Andhra Pradesh.

Infrastructure 
The station is equipped with a huge bus depot for storage and maintenance of buses.

Services 
Gudivada bus station primarily serves Andhra Pradesh and Telangana and has daily bus services to almost every city and town in Andhra Pradesh and there are also bus services to major cities and towns which are located in Karnataka, Tamil Nadu and Telangana. Courier and logistics services by APSRTC are also available at Gudivada bus station

Renovation 
Currently, the bus station is undergoing expansion and related development works are under progress. There are plans to name Gudivada bus station after Y. S. Jagan Mohan Reddy.

References 

Bus stations in Andhra Pradesh